Hallveig Jónsdóttir (born 9 July 1995) is an Icelandic basketball player who plays for Valur of the Icelandic Úrvalsdeild kvenna and the Icelandic national basketball team. In 2019, she won the Icelandic Championship and the Icelandic Cup with Valur.

Career
Hallveig started playing basketball at the age of nine with Breiðablik's junior teams. In 2012, she joined Valur where she played for three seasons before transferring to Keflavík in 2014. During her lone season with Keflavík, she won the Icelandic Company Cup in September 2014.

During the 2018–19 season, she helped Valur earn its first major trophies in women's basketball after the team won both the national championship and the Icelandic Cup. During the regular season, she averaged 9.8 points per game while shooting 35.2% from the three point range.

Valur started the 2019–20 season by defeating Keflavík, 105–81, in the annual Icelandic Super Cup. It was Valur's first Super Cup win and the victory made them the holders of all four major national crowns, the others being the national championship, the national cup and the league championship which is awarded for the best regular season record in the Úrvalsdeild.
On 13 February 2020, she scored 29 points, including 7 three pointers, in a 99–105 overtime loss against Reykjavík rivals KR.

On 2 June 2021, she won the national championship after Valur beat Haukar 3–0 in the Úrvalsdeild finals.

Icelandic national team
After playing with most of Iceland's junior national teams, Hallveig debuted with the senior team in 2013. She participated with the team at the Games of the Small States of Europe in 2017 and 2019.

References

External links
Icelandic statistics

1995 births
Living people
Hallveig Jonsdottir
Hallveig Jonsdottir
Shooting guards
Hallveig Jonsdottir
Hallveig Jonsdottir